Peshawar is the capital of Khyber Pakhtunkhwa province of Pakistan.Peshawar is the largest city of Khyber Pakhtunkhwa and one of the largest in Pakistan.Following are some of the major places in Peshawar:

Education
The following is a list of some of the public and private universities in Peshawar:
 Islamia College University
 Khyber Medical University
 University of Peshawar
 University of Engineering and Technology, Peshawar
 Agricultural University (Peshawar)
 National University of Computer and Emerging Sciences, Peshawar Campus (NU-FAST)
 IMSciences (Institute of Management Sciences)
 Gandhara University
 Iqra National University, Peshawar (Formerly Peshawar Campus of Iqra University KPK)
 Qurtuba University (Qurtuba University of Science & Information Technology)
 Sarhad University of Science and Information Technology
 CECOS University of IT and Emerging Sciences
 Preston University
 City University of Science and Information Technology, Peshawar
 Frontier Women University
 Abasyn University (Abasyn University, Peshawar)

Landmarks
The following is a list of other significant landmarks in the city that still exist in the 21st century:
 General
 Governor's House
 Peshawar Garrison Club
 Kotla Mohsin Khan – the residence of Mazullah Khan, 17th century Pashtu poet
 Qissa Khwani Bazaar
 Kapoor Haveli Residence of Prithviraj Kapoor – famous Bollywood actor
 Forts
 Bala Hisar Fort
 Colonial monuments
 Chowk Yadgar (formerly the "Hastings Memorial")
 Cunningham clock tower – built in 1900 and called "Ghanta Ghar"
 Buddhist
 Gorkhatri – an ancient site of Buddha's alms or begging bowl, and the headquarters of Syed Ahmad Shaheed, Governor Avitabile
 Pashto Academy – the site of an ancient Buddhist university
 Shahji ki Dheri – the site of King Kanishka's famous Buddhist stupa. It was once the tallest stupa in India and served as the model for pagodas in China and Japan. The site is now a slum located outside the Gunj Gate of the old Walled City called Akhunabad. The stupa was described by Chinese pilgrims in the 7th century as the tallest stupa in all India with a height of 591–689 feet.
 Hindu
 Panj Tirath – an ancient Hindu site with 5 sacred ponds, that has been converted into a park (Khyber-Pakhtunkhwa (K-P) Chamber of Commerce and Industry)
 Gorkhatri - sacred site for yogis  Guru Gorkhnath temple
 Aasamai temple near Lady Reading Hospital (LRH)
 Sikh
 Sikh Gurudwara at Jogan Shah
 Parks
 Army Stadium – composed of an amusement park for children and families, restaurants, banks, play pens and a shopping arcade
 Wazir Bagh – laid in 1802, by Fatteh Khan, Prime Minister of Shah Mahmud Khan
 Ali Mardan Khan Gardens (also known as Khalid bin Waleed Park) – formerly named "Company Bagh"
 Shahi Bagh – a small portion constitutes the site of Arbab Niaz Stadium
 Mosques
 Mohabbat Khan Mosque
 Qasim Ali Khan Mosque
 Museums
 Peshawar Museum (Victoria Memorial Hall)

Sports
 Arbab Niaz Stadium

See also
 Tourism in Pakistan
 Tourism in Khyber Pakhtunkhwa

References

External links
 List of tourist places in Peshawar at 

Peshawar
Peshawar